Magik Four: A New Adventure is the fourth album in the Magik series by well-known trance DJ and producer Tiësto. As with the rest of the Magik series, the album is a live turntable mix.

Track listing
 Darkstar – "Feel Me" – 5:58
 Kamaya Painters – "Northern Spirit" – 4:17
 The Ambush – "Everlast" – 3:56
 Art of Trance – "Easter Island" [Cygnus X Mix] – 4:02
 Arrakis – "Aira Force" [Main Mix] – 5:27
 Sean Dexter – "Synthetica" [Extended Mix] – 4:36
 The Sneaker – "Scatterbomb" [String Mix] – 4:53
 Kai Tracid – "Your Own Reality" [Tracid Mix] – 2:22
 Vimana – "We Came" – 7:32
 Der Dritte Raum – "Trommelmaschine" – 3:33
 DJ Tiësto – "Sparkles" – 5:47
 Armin – "Communication" – 6:03
 Allure – "We Ran At Dawn" – 3:57
 Loop Control – "Exceptionally Beautiful" – 4:12
 Mox Epoque featuring Nina – "I Feel My..." [Extended Instrumental] – 3:58
 Mauro Picotto – "Pulsar" [Picotto Tea Mix] – 3:05

Tiësto compilation albums
1999 compilation albums
Black Hole Recordings albums